Maa  is the eighth album of Finnish a cappella ensemble Rajaton released in 2007 in celebration of the ensemble's 10th anniversary. Maa, is a Finnish word which, depending on context, can be translated to mean country, earth, land, ground or soil. The name is in reference to the 'back to the roots' nature of the album - Rajaton's debut album, Nova, similarly consisted of songs composed to Finnish poetry. A new a cappella version of the Jean Sibelius orchestral piece Valse triste is also included, marking the 50th anniversary of his death.

After the album's release a 31 concert anniversary tour, Ääni On Rajaton, began. They were supported by guitarist Petteri Sariola.

Track listing

External links
 Official Rajaton website
 Rajaton - Maa at Last.fm

Rajaton albums